Chitrabhanu (July 26, 1922 – April 19, 2019) was a prominent figure in American Jainism. He was one of the co-founders of JAINA.

Personal life
He was born as Rup-Rajendra Shah on July 26, 1922 in a small town Takhatgarh in Pali district of Rajasthan, India. He studied psychology at Bangalore. He found Acharya Sagaranand as his Guru. He became a Jain monk on February 6, 1942 at the age of 20 at Palitana and was named Muni Chandraprabha Sagar for 29 years.

In 1970 he was invited to attend The Second Spiritual Summit Conference to be held in April in Geneva, Switzerland. Jain monks are traditionally not permitted to travel overseas. He gave up monkhood in 1970 to attend the Summit, and became an ordinary shravaka. He also married Pramoda Shah in 1971. He has two sons, Rajeev Chitrabhanu and Darshan Chitrabhanu.

He died in his Mumbai residence surrounded by family members on April 19, 2019.

In Europe 
After attending the conference in Geneva, Chitrabhanu travelled to France and the UK.

In USA 
After spending some time in Africa and Europe, he came to the USA in 1971 to attend the Third Spiritual Summit at the Harvard Divinity School. His speech at the Third Spiritual Summit received good recognition and was dubbed as "Hit Speaker of the Day" by a local Boston newspaper. This resulted in many invitations across the east coast including churches, universities, and seminars.   

In 1973, he founded the Jain Meditation International Center in Manhattan, New York City. He claimed to attain enlightenment in 1981 by the ocean at San Diego.
In 1975 he met Jain Muni Sushil Kumarji to USA, the first practicing Jain monk on his visit to USA. Since being in the USA he has inspired the growth of 70 Jain centers in US and Canada. 

He was among the early promoters of Yoga in USA. His disciple Beryl Bender Birch developed her own style of yoga.

Establishment of JAINA 
With his guidance, a federation of all Jain associations termed JAINA (Federation of Jain Associations in North America), was founded which became the umbrella organization with more than 100,000 members.   For his unprecedented journey to bring the Jain tradition of ahimsa to the Western Hemisphere, Chitrabhanu received the Peace Abbey Courage of Conscience Award.

Vegetarianism

Chitrabhanu argued that Jainism is more of an ethical philosophy than a religion and that Jains do not eat meat or eggs as they have reverence for life. His wife Pramoda cooked all of his food and offered vegetarian cooking classes. Chitrabhanu consumed a lacto-vegetarian diet of fruit, legumes, vegetables, nuts, seeds and spices with dairy products. In his later life, Chitrabhanu authored articles supportive of veganism.

Selected publications 

He wrote twenty-five books which mainly deal with the topic of self-realization. Some of these are:

The Jain Path to Freedom
The Dynamics of Jain Meditation
Meditations on the Seven Energy Centers
The Philosophy of Soul and Matter
Ten Days Journey into the Self
The Miracle is You and Reflections

See also
 Jain Center of America
 Jainism in America

References

External links 
 Guruji Chitrabhanuji's 90th birthday Celebration at JCA

1922 births
2019 deaths
20th-century Indian Jain writers
20th-century Indian monks
20th-century Indian philosophers
20th-century Jain monks
Indian expatriates in the United States
Indian Jain monks
Indian vegetarianism activists